Donald Roberts is a professor of entomology at the Uniformed Services University of the Health Sciences (USUHS) in Bethesda, Maryland, USA.

Career 
Roberts has researched, written, and lectured around the world. He has worked as an advisor to United Nations (UN) bodies – including the World Health Organization (WHO). 

He serves as an advisor to the Bill & Melinda Gates Foundation and is on the board of Africa Fighting Malaria (AFM).

Publications 

 — which is cited by —

 
 Attaran, Roberts, Curtis, and Kilama. 2000. Balancing risks on the backs of the poor. Nature Medicine. 6(7):729–731.

References

External links 
 Donald Roberts] - SourceWatch

Living people
American entomologists
American academics